Patton is a hamlet in Shropshire, England.

It is located in the civil parish of Stanton Long on the B4378 road between Bourton and Brockton. The market town of Much Wenlock is  distant.

History
The name was first recorded in 901 as Peatingtune; it is Old English and means from "the farmstead of Peat(t)a" or "the farmstead of the sons or people of Peat(t)a".

The manor of Patton was recorded in the Domesday Book as Patintone and belonging to the hundred of Patton. The Book recorded in Patton only 6 households, which represented a quite small settlement. The caput of Patton hundred no longer was in Patton itself by 1066, but at Corfham which was a manor held by the king.

Hundred

It formed part of and gave its name to the Saxon hundred of Patton, which existed until the early 12th century.

Patton hundred was then amalgamated with Culvestan into the new Munslow hundred. However circa 1200 a part of the Patton township was ceded to the franchise of Wenlock.

References

Hamlets in Shropshire